Boehm is a German surname, transliterated from Böhm (literally: Bohemian, from Bohemia) or reflective of a spelling adopted by a given family before the introduction of the umlaut diacritic. It may refer to:
 Aleksandra Ziółkowska-Boehm (born 1949), American-Polish author
 Barry Boehm (1935 – 2022), American software engineer
 Christopher Boehm (b. 1931) American Anthropologist, Primatologist
 David Boehm (1893–1962), American screenwriter
 Doug Boehm (born 1969), American record producer and sound engineer
 Edward Marshall Boehm (1913–1969), American sculptor
 Elisabet Boehm (1859–1943), German feminist and writer
 Erhard F. Boehm (1911–1994), Australian farmer and amateur ornithologist
 Felix Boehm (1924–2021), Swiss-American physicist
 Franz Boehm (1880–1945), Roman Catholic priest, resistance fighter and martyr
 Gero von Boehm (born 1954), German journalist
 Gottfried Boehm (born 1942), German art historian and philosopher
 Hanns-Peter Boehm (born 1928), German chemist and professor emeritus
 Henry Boehm (1775–1875), American clergyman and pastor
 Joseph Boehm (Sir (Joseph) Edgar Boehm, 1834–1890), Austrian sculptor
 Martin Boehm (1725–1812), American clergyman and pastor
 Mary Louise Boehm (1928–2002), American pianist and painter
 Paul Boehm (born 1974), Canadian skeleton racer
 Peter Boehm, Canadian diplomat
 Peter M. Boehm (1845–1914), soldier in the American Civil War, Medal of Honor recipient
 Robert Boehm (1914–2006), American political activist
 Ron Boehm (born 1943), retired ice hockey winger
 Roy Boehm (1924–2008), known as the "First SEAL"; established the U.S. Navy's first SEAL Team.
 Sydney Boehm (1908–1990), American screenwriter and producer
 Theobald Boehm (1794–1881), Bavarian inventor and musician
 Boehm system of flute fingering
 Boehm system (clarinet), a similar system for the clarinet
 Theodore R. Boehm (born 1938), Justice of the Indiana Supreme Court
 Traugott Wilhelm Boehm (1836–1917) founder of Hahndorf Academy in South Australia

See also 
 Boehm system
 Boehm system (clarinet)
 Boehm garbage collector
 Behm
 Bohm (surname)
 Böhm
 Böhme (disambiguation)
 Böhmer

German-language surnames
Surnames of Czech origin